Shopaholic and Baby (2007) is the fifth novel in the popular 'Shopaholic' series. It is a chick-lit novel by Sophie Kinsella, a pseudonym of Madeline Wickham. It follows the story of Becky Brandon (née Bloomwood) and her husband Luke as they navigate Becky's first pregnancy.

Plot
The plot jumps several months forward from Shopaholic and Sister. Becky is now heavily pregnant with her first child and is preparing for the arrival of her newborn. During a sonogram appointment with Luke, Becky is briefly left unaccompanied in the ultrasound room. Desperate to know the gender of the baby despite Luke's wishes to the contrary, Becky takes the ultrasound equipment to find out for herself. She initially thinks she can see male genitals on the baby but the sonographer returns, catching Becky and explains what Becky is actually examining is her own bladder.

Back at the apartment, it's revealed that Becky and Luke have recently sold up in order to buy a house. The couple have difficulty finding a place which meets Becky's approval. Becky's relationship with Jess has drastically improved since the last novel as is evident when Jess arrives. Jess continues in her endeavor to make Becky more environmentally friendly, encouraging her to use second hand baby items, the mere prospect of which Becky finds horrifying. Becky's friendship with Suze has also improved despite Suze's involvement with Lulu, a mother introduced in the last novel whom Becky doesn't get along with. The two still have the occasional insult run-ins due to their obvious dislike for each other. Once again, Becky and Luke's marriage has been strained due to increasing anxiety on Luke's part over a new business partnership with the Arcodas group.

While shopping at a luxury baby boutique, Bambino, Becky overhears a conversation about a celebrity obstetrician, Venetia Carter. Becky - fantasizing over the idea of a luxurious birthing experience - rushes home to consult Luke. Much to Becky's disdain Luke is firm and insists Becky remain a patient of Dr. Braine (an older obstetrician who has seen many of the Brandon women through their pregnancies, and whom Becky doesn't like and finds dull). After much nagging from Becky an exasperated Luke admits defeat and the couple attend an appointment with Venetia. Becky is taken aback when Venetia treats her with little interest whilst being flirtatious with Luke. She is further upset when it's revealed Venetia and Luke used to date during their time together in college, but she consoles herself with the knowledge Venetia is in a relationship.

At a later appointment Becky is distraught to learn that Venetia is newly single, her married boyfriend having returned to his wife. This sets alarm bells ringing for Becky. As the novel progresses, Becky grows more and more suspicious of the relationship between Luke and Venetia; even going as far as to hire a private detective. As the baby's impending birth draws ever closer, Venetia and Becky have a dispute during an obstetric appointment, wherein Venetia spitefully confesses that she believes Becky and Luke should never have married and that she has every intention to pursue Luke once the baby is born. Once Becky has recovered from the shock of this revelation she plans to out Venetia's plans to Luke, hoping he'll be similarly horrified. Becky arrives at the party Venetia and Luke are attending only to find the two dancing together. The stress of witnessing this causes her to pass out. When Becky comes around, Luke is apologetic but denies any romantic involvement with Venetia. He admits the truth to Becky about his previous relationship with Venetia and she regrets making him switch obstetricians. The couple decide it's in their best interests to return to Dr. Braine and for a brief while, and everything seems to be going smoothly. Then while Luke is out, Becky receives photos from the PI that she hired named, Jim, and discovers Venetia along with Lulu in the company of Iain Walker, the CEO of the Arcodas Group. Although he claims Luke hasn't changed, Becky isn't fooled and points him out from behind Iain. Jim gets angry and yells at his son for screwing up. His son defends himself by admitting he had been following Iain, Lulu and Venetia around in secret due to possible suspicion on them trying to ruin Brandon Communications' reputation by running it out of business. Overhearing this, Becky finally realizes Venetia's involvement with Iain. As she thinks about it more, Becky realizes how much she is motivated in destroying Luke' company and reputation in order to force him to leave her. She convinces Jim to apologize to his son as she now knows what's going on and she must save Brandon C.'s reputation. She is also convinced that Lulu was also involved because of her personal hated for Becky and jealousy of her friendship with Suze. When she shows Luke the photos of Iain and Venetia together, he demands Becky to tell him where she got them. She refuses to elaborate and feels guilty for suspecting Luke of having an affair with Venetia.
 
During her baby shower, Becky shows Suze photos she procured from her private investigator of Lulu in an unflattering light. Looking through the photos, Suze sees the truth of her hypocrisy in being unable to control her wild children and also her affair with Iain. Finally realizing how much of a hypocrite she is and despite Becky encouraging her to expose the latter to the Daily World, Suze decides she will end her friendship with her. Becky unwittingly comes across a love note sent by Venetia amongst gifts for the baby. Sneaking away from her own party, she goes to the birthing center in order to confront Venetia, pretending to be in early labor. Family and friends arrive at the clinic anticipating the baby's birth and when Venetia comes into the birthing room, Becky tells everyone present about the obstetrician's scheme. Luke, in disbelief, demands an explanation and becomes increasingly enraged as Venetia talks and including her affair with Iain in order to destroy Brandon C's reputation. As an argument begins, Suze confronts him for not telling everyone else the truth and only telling Becky about his past. Luke finally reveals to everyone present that Venetia has always been troublesome and even once feigning a pregnancy in order to keep him in a relationship he disapproved of. He didn't regret breaking up with her because of the trouble she caused him over the years. Enraged, Venetia tries one last effort to make him take her back and leave Becky by rudely calling her a dumb little airhead who doesn't deserve him. Luke refuses and tells Venetia off that he loves his wife regardless. Unlike Venetia who he sees as manipulative and conniving, Becky is a caring and intuitive person who puts others before herself. Whilst revelations are coming out into the open, Becky takes this opportunity to explain that she and Luke are effectively homeless as the home they had planned to purchase has been bought from under them in the midst of all the trouble Venetia has caused. To console Becky, Suze offers her and Luke her family's unused summer home in Scotland. However, Becky's mother, Jane, insists that they stay with her and Graham in Surrey.

During the dispute, Becky's water breaks and she is calm about it. While everyone else admires Becky's calmness during her water breaking, a furious Jane reprimands Venetia for her behavior stating that she caused too much trouble in her family's life and orders her out of the room. Dr. Braine is called by another family member in order to assist during the birth. After Venetia leaves, Suze is disgusted by this and announces her intent to write an exposé about Venetia in the British tabloid magazine, "The Daily World", to help other pregnant women to avoid her. Dr. Braine arrives and helps Paula, an assistant working for Venetia in the delivery of Luke and Becky's child into the world, a daughter they name Minnie. Relieved, Becky and Luke are given some privacy in welcoming Minnie.

The book ends with Luke, Becky and Minnie living modestly in the Bloomwood's family home.

Shopaholic Series 
The Secret Dreamworld of a Shopaholic (2000) also published as Confessions of a Shopaholic (2001)
Shopaholic Abroad (2001) also published as Shopaholic Takes Manhattan (2002)
Shopaholic Ties The Knot (2002)
Shopaholic & Sister (2004)
Shopaholic & Baby (2007)
Mini Shopaholic (2010)
Shopaholic to the Stars (2014)
Christmas Shopaholic (2019)

Character Introduction
 Venetia Carter: Luke's ex-girlfriend from college who is a top celebrity obstetrician. Becky wanted to go to her, but Luke adamantly refused and eventually she saw why. It's later revealed that she's involved in an affair with Iain Walker as a means to help him ruin Brandon C's reputation in order to make Luke leave Becky. Venetia's reputation is ruined when Luke exposes her for feigning a pregnancy to keep him in a relationship he never wanted and didn't regret breaking up with her. Angered, she demanded that he leave Becky at once and take her back. Luke refused claiming Venetia caused them a lot of trouble with her manipulative and conniving ways. She also faces Jane's wrath and she is reprimanded for what she did to Becky. After ordering her out of the room, Suze announces her intentions to write an article to "The Daily World", warning pregnant women to avoid Venetia at all costs. It's implied that Venetia's career as a celebrity obstetrician is ruined because of the callous and disgusting way she treated Becky.
 Iain Walker: The owner of the Arcodas Group who is involved with Venetia to ruin Brandon C's reputation. He's also implied to been having an affair with both her and Suze's best friend, Lulu. When Becky's PI procured the pictures of him with Venetia and with the son's confession, she realizes she could use Iain's womanizing ways against him. In Mini Shopaholic and to avoid a potential lawsuit, Iain agrees to pay for the damages done to Brandon C's reputation with his lies as long as Becky doesn't reveal the pictures to the British tabloid "The Daily World".
 Jim the PI and his son: The private investigator father and son team whom Becky hires to spy on Luke. However, when Jim's son digs up evidence proving Iain and Venetia's plans to ruin Brandon C's reputation, Becky realizes what's truly going on.
 Dr. Braine: An elderly doctor who has seen Brandon women' pregnancies over the years. Becky originally doesn't like him as she finds him boring and dull. She later agreed to return to being his patient after learning about Venetia's past with Luke. Annabel is the one who presumably calls him in to assist Paula in helping Becky give birth to Minnie Brandon.
 Paula: Venetia's kind assistant who calls in Becky and Luke's family. She was the only one who was allowed to stay by both families to assist Dr. Braine in helping Becky give birth to Minnie.
 Minnie Brandon: Luke and Becky's daughter.

References

External links
Sophie Kinsella's official website
Sophie Kinsella's official U.K. website

2007 British novels
Works published under a pseudonym
Chick lit novels
Novels by Madeline Wickham
Novels set in London
Bantam Books books